"Still the Same" is a 1978 song written and recorded by the American singer Bob Seger. It hit #4 on the U.S. Billboard Hot 100 chart.

Lyrics and music
"Still the Same" is a midtempo ballad that begins with what Billboard describes as a "catchy piano" part.  According to Billboard contributor Ed Harrison, the harmony vocals by Venetta Fields, Clydie King and Sherlie Matthews give the song an R&B flavor.

The lyrics describe a gambler who the singer admired but in the end walks away from because he will not change.  Some listeners believe the song is actually about an ex-girlfriend, rather than being literally about a gambler.  Seger has said that he has been asked for years who the song is about, and that it is actually an amalgamation of characters he met when he first went to Hollywood.  Seger said to Bob Costas that "They’re simply really charming, but they have terrible flaws, but part of the appeal is the charisma."

Personnel
Credits are adapted from the liner notes of Seger's 1994 Greatest Hits compilation.

The Silver Bullet Band
Bob Seger – lead vocals, piano, acoustic guitar
Robyn Robbins – organ
Chris Campbell – bass
David Teegarden – drums, percussion

Additional musicians
Venetta Fields – background vocals
Clydie King – background vocals
Sherlie Matthews – background vocals

Reception
Billboard contributor Ed Harrison regarded "Still the Same" as the most "striking" song on Stranger in Town.  Cash Box said that "the sit-up beat, acoustic guitar work and starkly melodic piano passages have a driving presence."  Cash Box also said that the hook is "irresistible." Record World described it as "a melancholy, mid-tempo rocker in the introspective style that helped Seger connect up with a large audience."

Charts

Weekly charts

Year-end charts

Certifications

References

External links
 Lyrics of this song
 

1978 singles
Bob Seger songs
Capitol Records singles
Songs written by Bob Seger
Song recordings produced by Punch Andrews
Song recordings produced by Bob Seger